The National Council on U.S.-Arab Relations (NCUSAR) is an American non-profit organization with the goal of improving Americans' knowledge and understanding of the Arab world.

Background
Founded in 1983, NCUSAR is a non-profit organization that works with students, policymakers, and the public to increase knowledge and understanding of the Arab world. It is located in Washington DC, where it convenes seminars with specialists in the field of Arab-U.S. relations. The seminars, which are open to the public, cover issues related to politics, the economy, and humanitarian aid, such as U.S. policy in Yemen and the U.S.-Saudi diplomatic relationship.

The council is led by Dr. John Duke Anthony, and is staffed by professionals and experts in the field of Arab politics. It is supported primarily by philanthropists, individuals, and institutions in the United States and the Arab world.

Mission and activities
The Council's mission is to improve American awareness and understanding of Arab countries, the Middle East, and the Islamic world. It does this by promoting programs for leadership development, educational lectures and publications, and public forums. NCUSAR hosts the annual Arab-U.S. Policymakers Conference, a gathering to discuss pressing issues in the Arab world. It also sponsors the intercollegiate Model Arab League, a student forum similar to the Model United Nations, as well as educational programs on Capitol Hill to discuss issues pertaining to the US, the Middle East, and the Islamic world more generally.

References

External links
National Council on U.S.-Arab Relations (NCUSAR).
Arab-U.S. Policymakers Conference
Model Arab League
Free NCUSAR Publications

United States friendship associations
Political advocacy groups in the United States
Organizations established in 1983

ast:ONG